Vladimir Yevgenyevich Nesterov (1 July 1949 – 28 December 2022) was a Russian engineer who was the former general director of Khrunichev State Research and Production Space Center, one of the world's leading space launch providers.

Biography

Born in Cherepovets, Nesterov graduated from Moscow Aviation Institute in 1972 with a Master's degree in mechanical engineering, and from the Dzerzhinsky Military Academy of Rocket Forces in 1978. He served in the Soviet Army from 1972 to 1992, after which he joined the Russian Space Agency, first serving as a deputy head of Directorate for launch vehicles and ground infrastructure until 2004, and then as the head of the same directorate 2004–2005. On 25 November 2005, he was appointed general director of Khrunichev by a Russian Federation presidential decree.

See also
 2022 Russian businessmen mystery deaths

References

1949 births
2022 deaths
Soviet engineers
20th-century Russian engineers
21st-century Russian engineers
People from Cherepovets
Moscow Aviation Institute alumni
Recipients of the Medal of the Order "For Merit to the Fatherland" II class
Recipients of the Order "For Merit to the Fatherland", 4th class
Recipients of the Order of Honour (Russia)
Recipients of the Order of Merit (Ukraine), 3rd class
Recipients of the Order of the Red Star
State Prize of the Russian Federation laureates
Soviet military engineers
Russian military engineers